Kurganny is a rural locality (a khutor) in Kalmykovskoye Rural Settlement, Kletsky District, Volgograd Oblast, Russia. The population was 73 as of 2010. There are 2 streets.

Geography 
Kurganny is located in steppe, 51 km southwest of Kletskaya (the district's administrative centre) by road. Kalmykovsky is the nearest rural locality.

References 

Rural localities in Kletsky District